This local electoral calendar for 2019 lists the subnational elections held in 2019. Referendums, retention elections, and national by-elections (special elections) are also included.

January
3 January: Federated States of Micronesia, Kosrae, Lieutenant Governor (2nd round)
6 January: Hong Kong, Rural Committees (1st phase)
13 January: Hong Kong, Rural Committees (2nd phase)
19 January: India, Assam, North Cachar Hills, Autonomous District Council
20 January: 
Hong Kong, Rural Committees (3rd phase)
Italy, Cagliari, Chamber of Deputies by-election
21 January: 
Cook Islands, Ivirua, Parliament by-election
India
Assam
Dhemaji District, Mising Autonomous Council
Dibrugarh District, Sonowal Kachari Autonomous Council
Goalpara District and Kamrup District, Rabha Hasong Autonomous Council
Telangana, Village Councils (1st phase)
Philippines, Bangsamoro Autonomous Region in Muslim Mindanao (BARMM), Autonomy referendum (1st part)
25 January: India, Telangana, Village Councils (2nd phase)
26 January: Malaysia, Cameron Highlands, House of Representatives by-election
27 January: 
Argentina, La Rioja, 
Japan, Yamanashi, Governor
Taiwan, Taichung and Taipei, Legislative Yuan by-elections
28 January: India, Rajasthan, Legislative Assembly (Ramgarh only)
30 January: India, Telangana, Village Councils (3rd phase)
31 January: Ghana, Ayawaso West, Parliament by-election
31 January – 13 February: Germany, Bavaria,

February
2 February: Pakistan, NA-91, National Assembly by-election
3 February: Japan, Aichi, Governor
6 February: Philippines, Bangsamoro Autonomous Region in Muslim Mindanao (BARMM), Autonomy referendum (2nd part)
10 February: 
Italy, Abruzzo, Regional Council
Switzerland
Appenzell Ausserrhoden, Executive Council
Basel-Landschaft, 
Basel-Stadt, referendums
Bern, 
Geneva, referendums
St. Gallen, 
Ticino, referendums
Uri, 
Zürich, 
12 February: 
United States, Oklahoma City, City Council
Zambia, Sesheke, National Assembly by-election
24 February: 
Italy, Sardinia, Regional Council
Japan, Okinawa, Landfill referendum
25 February: Canada, Burnaby South, Outremont and York—Simcoe, House of Commons by-elections
26 February: United States
Chicago, Mayor and City Council (1st round)
New York City, Public Advocate special election
27 February: India, Meghalaya
Jaintia Hills Autonomous District, Council
Khasi Hills Autonomous District, Council
28 February: Bangladesh, Dhaka North, Mayor by-election

March
2 March: Malaysia, Semenyih, House of Representatives by-election
3 March: 
Lithuania, 
Nicaragua
North Caribbean Coast Autonomous Region, Regional Council
South Caribbean Coast Autonomous Region, Regional Council
 Poland, Gdańsk, 
5 March: 
Federated States of Micronesia, Chuuk, House of Representatives
United States, Tampa, Mayor and City Council (1st round)
9 March: Nigeria
Abia, Governor and House of Assembly
Adamawa, Governor and House of Assembly
Akwa Ibom, Governor and House of Assembly
Anambra, House of Assembly
Bauchi, Governor and House of Assembly
Bayelsa, House of Assembly
Benue, Governor and House of Assembly
Borno, Governor and House of Assembly
Cross River, Governor and House of Assembly
Delta, Governor and House of Assembly
Ebonyi, Governor and House of Assembly
Edo, House of Assembly
Ekiti, House of Assembly
Enugu, Governor and House of Assembly
Federal Capital Territory, Local Government Councils and Chairmen
Gombe, Governor and House of Assembly
Imo, Governor and House of Assembly
Jigawa, Governor and House of Assembly
Kaduna, Governor and House of Assembly
Kano, Governor and House of Assembly
Katsina, Governor and House of Assembly
Kebbi, Governor and House of Assembly
Kogi, House of Assembly
Kwara, Governor and House of Assembly
Lagos, Governor and House of Assembly
Nasarawa, Governor and House of Assembly
Niger, Governor and House of Assembly
Ogun, Governor and House of Assembly
Ondo, House of Assembly
Osun, House of Assembly
Oyo, Governor and House of Assembly
Plateau, Governor and House of Assembly
Rivers, Governor and House of Assembly
Sokoto, Governor and House of Assembly
Taraba, Governor and House of Assembly
Yobe, Governor and House of Assembly
Zamfara, Governor and House of Assembly
10 March: 
Argentina, Neuquén, 
Austria, Salzburg, 
Bangladesh, Sub-district Councils (1st phase)
Switzerland, St. Gallen, 
12 March: United States, Phoenix, Mayor (2nd round) and City Council (1st round) special elections
16 March: 
Kuwait, Second District and Third District, National Assembly by-elections
Taiwan, Changhua, Kinmen, New Taipei and Tainan, Legislative Yuan by-elections
17 March: 
Lithuania, 
Monaco, Communal Council
Switzerland, Appenzell Ausserrhoden, Cantonal Council
Bangladesh, Sub-district Councils (2nd phase)
Cook Islands, Tengatangi-Areora-Ngatiarua, Parliament by-election
19 March: United States, Jacksonville, Mayor, Property Appraiser, Sheriff, Supervisor of Elections, Tax Collector and City Council (1st round)
20 March: Netherlands
Dutch Provincial Parliaments
Dutch Water Boards
Bonaire, Electoral College and Island Council
Saba, Electoral College and Island Council
Sint Eustatius, Electoral College
22 March: Samoa, Fa'asaleleaga, Legislative Assembly by-election
23 March: 
Australia, New South Wales, Legislative Assembly and Legislative Council
Nigeria
Adamawa, House of Assembly (rescheduled) in Nassarawo/Binyeri, revote in Uba/Gaya)
Bauchi, Governor (revote) in Tafawa Balewa)
Benue, Governor and House of Assembly (revote in) Kwande and Ukum)
Kano, Governor and House of Assembly (revote) in Nasarawa)
Kogi, House of Assembly (revote in) Igalamela-Odolu, Lokoja and Omala)
Plateau, Governor and House of Assembly (revote) in Langtang South)
Sokoto, Governor and House of Assembly (revote) in Kebbe)
24 March: 
Austria, Salzburg, 
Bangladesh, Sub-district Councils (3rd phase)
Comoros
Anjouan, Governor (1st round)
Grande Comore, Governor (1st round)
Mohéli, Governor (1st round)
Ecuador, 
Guayaquil, 
Quito, 
Italy, Basilicata, Regional Council
Liechtenstein, Mayors and Municipal Councils
Switzerland, Zürich, 
26 March: Saint Helena, Ascension and Tristan da Cunha, Tristan da Cunha, Chief Islander and Island Council
27 March: Antigua and Barbuda, Barbuda, Council
28 March: Nigeria, Adamawa, Governor (revote in 44 constituencies)
30 March: 
Libya, Municipal Councils
United States, Louisiana, Circuit Court of Appeal special election
31 March: 
Bangladesh, Sub-district Councils (4th phase)
Democratic Republic of the Congo, Beni, Butembo and Yumbi,  and National Assembly by-elections
Myanmar, Yangon, City Development Committee
Turkey, Mayors and Municipal Councils
Istanbul, Mayor (election nullified)
Switzerland
Basel-Landschaft, Executive Council and Landrat
Lucerne, Executive Council (1st round) and Cantonal Council

April
2 April: 
United States
Anchorage, Assembly
Chicago, Mayor and City Council (2nd round)
Colorado Springs, Mayor and City Council
Kansas City, MO, Mayor and City Council (1st round)
Las Vegas, Mayor and City Council (1st round)
St. Louis, Board of Aldermen
Wisconsin, Supreme Court and Court of Appeals
3 April: South Korea, Changwon-Seongsan and Tongyeong-Goseong, National Assembly 
4 April: 
Jamaica, Portland Eastern, House of Representatives by-election
United Kingdom, Newport West, House of Commons by-election
5 April: 
Kenya, Embakasi South and Ugenya, National Assembly by-elections
5–6 April: Czech Republic, Prague, Senate by-election (1st round)
7 April: 
Argentina, Río Negro, 
Japan, Unified Local elections (1st phase)
Aichi, 
Nagoya, City Council
Akita, 
Aomori, 
Chiba, 
Ehime, 
Fukui, Governor and 
Fukuoka, Governor and 
Fukuoka City, City Council
Gifu, 
Gunma, 
Hiroshima, 
Hiroshima City, Mayor and City Council
Hokkaido, Governor and 
Sapporo, Mayor and City Council
Hyogo, 
Kobe, City Council
Ishikawa, 
Kagawa, 
Kagoshima, 
Kanagawa, Governor and 
Kawasaki, City Council
Yokohama, City Council
Kōchi, 
Kumamoto, 
Kyoto, 
Kyoto City, City Council
Mie, Governor and 
Miyazaki, 
Nagano, 
Nagasaki, 
Nara, Governor and 
Niigata, 
Ōita, Governor and 
Okayama, 
Osaka, Governor and 
Osaka City, Mayor and City Council
Saga, 
Saitama, 
Saitama City, City Council
Shiga, 
Shimane, Governor and 
Shizuoka, 
Tochigi, 
Tokushima, Governor and 
Tottori, Governor and 
Toyama, 
Wakayama, 
Yamagata, 
Yamaguchi, 
Yamanashi, 
Switzerland, Ticino, Council of State and 
11 April: 
India
Andhra Pradesh, Legislative Assembly
Arunachal Pradesh, Legislative Assembly
Odisha, Legislative Assembly (1st phase)
Sikkim, Legislative Assembly
Zambia, Bahati and Roan, National Assembly by-elections
12–13 April: Czech Republic, Prague, Senate by-election (2nd round)
13 April: Nigeria
Federal Capital Territory, Local Government Councils and Chairmen 
Rivers, Governor and House of Assembly (revote in Abua–Odual, Ahoada West, Gokana and Opobo–Nkoro)
16 April: 
Canada, Alberta, Legislative Assembly
Qatar, Central Municipal Council
18 April: India, Odisha, Legislative Assembly (2nd phase)
20 April: Libya, Municipal Councils
21 April: 
Comoros
Anjouan, Governor (2nd round)
Grande Comore, Governor (2nd round)
Mohéli, Governor (2nd round)
Japan
Okinawa 3rd district and Osaka 12th district, House of Representatives by-elections
Unified Local elections (2nd phase), City, Ward, Town and Village Mayors and Councils
23 April: 
Canada, Prince Edward Island, Legislative Assembly and Electoral Reform referendum
India, Odisha, Legislative Assembly (3rd phase)
United States, Tampa, Mayor and City Council (2nd round)
25 April: Kenya, Wajir West, National Assembly by-election
27 April: Nigeria, Zamfara, Local Government Councils and Chairmen
28 April: 
Italy, Sicily, Mayors and City Councils (1st round)
Spain, Valencian Community, Parliament
Switzerland, Appenzell Innerrhoden

Landsgemeinde
29 April: India, Odisha, Legislative Assembly (4th phase)

May
2 May: United Kingdom
England, Metropolitan Borough Councils, Unitary Authorities, District Councils and Mayors
Leeds, City Council
Liverpool, City Council
Manchester, City Council
Northern Ireland, District Councils
4 May: 
Australia, Tasmania, (Montgomery, Nelson and Pembroke) Legislative Council
United States
Arlington, Mayor and City Council (1st round)
Dallas, Mayor and City Council (1st round)
Fort Worth, Mayor and City Council
San Antonio, Mayor and City Council (1st round)
5 May: 
Bangladesh, Mymensingh, Mayor and City Corporation
Croatia, National Minorities Councils (1st round)
Panama, Mayors and Municipal Councils
Switzerland, Glarus, 
6 May: 
Canada, Nanaimo—Ladysmith, House of Commons by-election
India, Telangana, District Councils and Township Councils (1st phase)
7 May: United States, Denver, Mayor, Clerk, City Council (1st round) and Psilocybin Decriminalization referendum
8 May: South Africa, Provincial Legislatures
10 May: India, Telangana, District Councils and Township Councils (2nd phase)
11 May: Malaysia, Sandakan, House of Representatives by-election
12 May: 
Argentina, Córdoba, 
Italy, Sicily, Mayors and City Councils (2nd round)
New Caledonia, Provincial Assemblies
13 May: Philippines, Governors, Vice Governor, Provincial Councils, Mayors and Municipal Councils
14 May: 
India, Telangana, District Councils and Township Councils (3rd phase)
United States, Jacksonville, City Council (2nd round)
16 May: Canada, Newfoundland and Labrador, House of Assembly
19 May: 
Argentina, La Pampa, 
Croatia, National Minorities Councils (1st round)
Kosovo, North Kosovo, Mayors
Switzerland
Basel-Landschaft, 
Basel-Stadt, referendums
Bern, 
Grisons, 
Lucerne, Executive Council (2nd round)
Obwalden, referendum
Schwyz, 
Solothurn, 
St. Gallen, 
Thurgau, 
Ticino, referendums
Uri, 
Valais, referendum
Zug, 
21 May: 
Malawi, Local Councils
United States, Phoenix, City Council special election (2nd round)
24 May: Ireland, City and County Councils
25 May: Malta, Local Councils
26 May: 
Belgium
Brussels-Capital Region, Brussels Parliament
Eastern Belgium, German-speaking Community Parliament
Flanders, Flemish Parliament
Wallonia, Walloon Parliament
Germany
Baden-Württemberg, 
Stuttgart Region, 
Stuttgart, 
Brandenburg, 
Bremen, Parliament and City Councils
Hamburg, 
Mecklenburg-Vorpommern, 
Rhineland-Palatinate, 
Palatinate District Association, 
Saarland, 
Saxony, 
Dresden, 
Leipzig, 
Saxony-Anhalt, 
Thuringia, 
Greece, Regional Councils and Municipal Councils (1st round)
Italy
Mayors and City Councils (1st round)
Piedmont, Regional Council
Pergine Valsugana and Trento, Chamber of Deputies by-elections
Spain, Regional Legislatures, Municipal Councils and Basque Foral Parliaments
Álava, Foral Parliament
Aragon, Parliament
Zaragoza, City Council
Asturias, Parliament
Balearic Islands, Parliament and Island Councils
Barcelona, City Council
Biscay, Foral Parliament
Canary Islands, Parliament and Island Cabildos
Cantabria, Parliament
Castile and León, Parliament
Castilla–La Mancha, Parliament
Ceuta, Assembly
Extremadura, Assembly
Gipuzkoa, Foral Parliament
La Rioja, Parliament
Madrid (Community), Assembly
Madrid, City Council
Melilla, Assembly
Murcia, Assembly
Navarre, Parliament
Seville, City Council
Valencia, City Council
Thailand, Chiang Mai constituency 8, 
29 May: India, Karnataka, Municipal Councils and Town Councils
30 May: 
Nauru, Anabar, Parliament by-election
Tonga,

June
1 June: United States, Cherokee Nation, Principal Chief, Deputy Chief and Tribal Council (1st round)
2 June: 
Argentina
Corrientes, 
Misiones, 
San Juan, 
Greece, Regional Councils and Municipal Councils (2nd round)
Japan, Aomori, Governor
Mexico
Aguascalientes, 
Baja California, Governor, Congress and Municipal Councils
Durango, 
Puebla, Governor and Municipal Councils special election
Quintana Roo, 
Tamaulipas, 
4 June: United States, Denver, Mayor, Auditor, Clerk and City Council (2nd round)
6 June: United Kingdom, Peterborough, House of Commons by-election
7 June: India, Telangana, Township Chairs and Deputy Chairs
8 June: 
India, Telangana, District Chairs and Deputy Chairs
United States
Arlington, City Council (2nd round)
Dallas, City Council (2nd round)
San Antonio, Mayor and City Council (2nd round)
9 June: 
Argentina
Chubut, 
Entre Ríos, 
Jujuy, 
Tucumán, 
Italy, Mayors and City Councils (2nd round)
11 June: United States, Las Vegas, City Council (2nd round)
15 June: Namibia, Ondangwa, National Assembly by-election
16 June: 
Argentina
Formosa, 
San Luis, 
Santa Fe, 
Tierra del Fuego, 
Germany, Rhineland-Palatinate, 
Guatemala, 
Guatemala City, Mayor
Mixco, Mayor
Villa Nueva, Mayor
Italy, Sardinia, Mayors and City Councils (1st round)
18 June: 
Bangladesh, Sub-district Councils (5th phase)
United States, Kansas City, MO, Mayor and City Council (2nd round)
22 June: Guernsey, Alderney, President by-election
23 June: Turkey, Istanbul, Mayor (revote)
24 June: Bangladesh, Bogra-6, House of the Nation by-election
29 June: Nigeria, Jigawa, Local Government Councils and Chairmen
30 June: 
Albania, Mayors, Municipal Councils, Unit Mayors and Unit Councils
Italy, Sardinia, Mayors and City Councils (2nd round)
Moldova, Gagauzia, 
Switzerland, St. Gallen,

July
11 July: Uganda, Nebbi, Parliament by-election
20 July: Pakistan, Khyber Pakhtunkhwa, Provincial Assembly
20 July – 2 August: Papua New Guinea, Local-Level Governments
21 July: 
Japan, Gunma, Governor
North Korea, Provincial People's Assemblies, County People's Assemblies and Municipal People's Assemblies
23 July: Pakistan, NA-205, National Assembly by-election
27 July: 
India, Tripura, District Councils, Township Councils and Village Councils
United States, Cherokee Nation, Tribal Council (2nd round)
29 July: Liberia, Montserrado District 15, House of Representatives by-election 
30 July: Zambia, Katuba, National Assembly by-election

August
1 August: 
United Kingdom, Brecon and Radnorshire, House of Commons by-election
United States, Nashville, Mayor and Metropolitan Council (1st round)
3 August: Zimbabwe, Lupane East, House of Assembly by-election
5 August: India, Vellore, House of the People by-election
6 August: United States
King County, Council (1st round)
Wichita, Mayor (1st round)
10 August: 
Gabon, Cocobeach,  Mbigou, Mékambo, Mimongo, Mitzic,  and Offoué-Onoye, National Assembly by-elections (1st round)
Nigeria, Bayelsa, Local Government Councils and Chairmen
11 August: Argentina, Santa Cruz, 
24 August: Sierra Leone, Freetown Constituency 110, Parliament by-election (election nullified)
25 August: Japan, Saitama, Governor
28 August: Liberia, Montserrado District 15, House of Representatives by-election (revote)
29 August: United Kingdom, Scotland, Shetland, Parliament by-election

September
1 September: 
Germany
Brandenburg, Parliament
Saxony, Parliament
Switzerland, Zürich, 
7 September: Zimbabwe, Glen View South, Mangwe and Masvingo North Ward 1, House of Assembly by-elections
8 September: 
Artsakh, Mayors, Local Councils and Community Chiefs
Japan, Iwate, Governor and 
Lithuania, Gargždai, Žiemgala constituency and Žirmūnai, Seimas by-elections 
Russia, State Duma by-elections, Federal Subject Heads, Federal Subject Legislatures, Municipal Heads, Municipal Councils, District Councils, Village Councils and Local referendums
Altai Republic,  and 
Astrakhan Oblast, 
Bashkortostan, Head
Bryansk Oblast, 
Chelyabinsk Oblast, 
Crimea, 
Kabardino-Balkaria, 
Kalmykia, 
Karachay-Cherkessia, 
Khabarovsk Krai,  and District 70, State Duma by-election
Kurgan Oblast, 
Kursk Oblast, 
Lipetsk Oblast, 
Mari El, 
Moscow, City Duma
Murmansk Oblast, 
Novgorod Oblast, District 134, State Duma by-election
Novosibirsk, 
Orenburg Oblast, 
Oryol Oblast, District 145, State Duma by-election
Saint Petersburg, Governor and 
Sakhalin Oblast, 
Sevastopol, 
Stavropol Krai, 
Sverdlovsk Oblast, District 174, State Duma by-election
Tatarstan, 
Tula Oblast, 
Tuva, 
Volgograd Oblast,  and 
Vologda Oblast,  
Zabaykalsky Krai, 
9 September: Norway, County Councils and Municipal Councils
10 September: 
Canada, Manitoba, Legislative Assembly
United States, North Carolina's 3rd congressional district and North Carolina's 9th congressional district, U.S. House of Representatives special elections
12 September: United States, Nashville, Mayor and Metropolitan Council (2nd round)
14 September: Sierra Leone, Falaba Constituency 40, Parliament by-election
21 September: Zimbabwe, Zaka East, House of Assembly by-election
22 September: 
Lithuania, Gargždai, Žiemgala constituency and Žirmūnai, Seimas by-elections 
Portugal, Madeira, Legislative Assembly
Switzerland, Schaffhausen, referendum
24 September: United States, Boston, City Council (1st round)
26 September: Saint Helena, Ascension and Tristan da Cunha, Ascension Island, Council
29 September: Argentina, Mendoza,

October
1 October: Canada, Northwest Territories, Legislative Assembly
3 October: 
Liberia, Grand Cape Mount, Senate by-election
United States, Memphis, Mayor and City Council (1st round)
5 October: 
Bangladesh, Rangpur-3, House of the Nation by-election
India, Uttarakhand, District Councils, Township Councils and Village Councils (1st phase)
8 October: United States, Raleigh, Mayor and City Council
11 October: India, Uttarakhand, District Councils, Township Councils and Village Councils (2nd phase)
12 October: 
New Zealand, Regional Councils, Mayors, Territorial Authority Councils and District Health Boards
Auckland, Mayor, Council and Local Boards
Greater Wellington, Regional Council, Mayors and Territorial Authority Councils
Wellington City, Mayor and Council
United States, Louisiana
Governor, Lieutenant Governor, Attorney General, Board of Elementary and Secondary Education, Commissioner of Agriculture and Forestry, Commissioner of Insurance, Secretary of State and Treasurer (1st round)
House of Representatives and Senate elections (1st round)
Supreme Court special election (1st round)
13 October: 
Argentina, Chaco, 
Austria, Vorarlberg, Parliament
Hungary, Mayors, County Assemblies and Municipal Assemblies
Budapest, Mayor and Assembly
15 October: 
Mozambique, 
Sri Lanka, Municipal Councils, Urban Councils and Divisional Councils
16 October: India, Uttarakhand, District Councils, Township Councils and Village Councils (3rd phase)
19 October: Australia
Christmas Island, Shire Council
Cocos (Keeling) Islands, Shire Council
Western Australia, Mayors, Regional Councils, City Councils and Shire Councils
20 October: 
Finland, Åland, Parliament and Municipal Councils
Moldova, Mayors (1st round), District Councils and Municipal Councils
Gagauzia, Mayors (1st round) and Municipal Councils
Switzerland
Bern, Executive Council (1st round)
Jura, referendum
Neuchâtel, Council of State
Uri, 
21 October: India
Haryana, Legislative Assembly
Maharashtra, Legislative Assembly
Samastipur and Satara, House of the People by-elections
23 October: 
Botswana, District Councils, City Councils and Town Councils
Thailand, Nakhon Pathom constituency 5, 
26 October: Nigeria, Kebbi, Local Government Councils and Chairmen
27 October: 
Argentina
Buenos Aires City, 
Buenos Aires, Governor, Chamber of Deputies, Senate, Mayors, Municipal Councils and School Counselors
Catamarca, 
La Rioja, 
Bulgaria, Mayors (1st round), Municipal Councils and Ward Mayors
Colombia,  Governors, Departmental Assemblies, Mayors, Municipal Councils and Local Administrative Boards
Bogotá, 
Cali, 
Medellín, 
Germany
Hanover, Lord Mayor (1st round)
Thuringia, Parliament
Italy, Umbria, Legislative Assembly
Japan
Miyagi, 
Saitama,

November
3 November: 
Bulgaria, Mayors (2nd round)
Moldova, Mayors (2nd round)
Gagauzia, Mayors (2nd round)
5 November: United States, State and Local elections
Kentucky
Governor, Agriculture Commissioner, Attorney General, Auditor, Secretary of State and Treasurer
Supreme Court and Court of Appeals special elections
Mississippi
Governor, Lieutenant Governor, Attorney General, Auditor, Commissioner of Agriculture and Commerce, Commissioner of Insurance, Public Service Commission, Secretary of State, Transportation Commission and Treasurer
House of Representatives and Senate
New Jersey, General Assembly
Pennsylvania, Commonwealth Court and Superior Court retention elections, and Superior Court
Texas, Prohibit State Income Tax constitutional referendum
Virginia, House of Delegates and Senate
Washington, Court of Appeals
Albuquerque, City Council (1st round) and Democracy Dollars Program referendum
Aurora, CO, Mayor and City Council
Boston, City Council (2nd round)
Charlotte, Mayor and City Council
Columbus, Mayor and City Council
Houston, Mayor and City Council (1st round)
Indianapolis, Mayor and City-County Council
King County, Council (2nd round)
Seattle, City Council
Miami, City Commission (1st round)
New York City, Public Advocate and Ranked-Choice Voting referendum
Philadelphia, Mayor and City Council
Pittsburgh, City Council
San Francisco, Mayor and District Attorney
Tucson, Mayor, City Council and Sanctuary City referendum
Wichita, Mayor (2nd round) and City Council
7 November: Kenya, Kibra, National Assembly by-election
10 November: 
Argentina, Salta, 
Germany, Hanover, Lord Mayor (2nd round)
Japan, Fukushima, 
12 November: Federated States of Micronesia, Pohnpei, Governor and State Legislature
14 November: United States, Memphis, City Council (2nd round)
16 November: 
India, Rajasthan, Municipal Corporations, Municipal Councils and Town Councils
Malaysia, Tanjung Piai, House of Representatives by-election
Nigeria
Bayelsa, Governor
Kogi, Governor
United States, Louisiana
Governor, Board of Elementary and Secondary Education and Secretary of State (2nd round)
House of Representatives and Senate (2nd round)
Supreme Court special election (2nd round)
17 November: Switzerland
Bern, Executive Council (2nd round)
Schaffhausen, referendum
St. Gallen, 
19 November: United States, Miami, City Commission (2nd round)
20 November: Ethiopia, Sidama, Regionalization referendum
21 November: Bermuda, Pembroke Central, House of Assembly by-election
24 November: 
Austria, Styria, Parliament
Hong Kong, District Councils
Japan, Kōchi, 
Macau, Industry, Commerce and Finance functional constituency, 
Switzerland
Basel-Landschaft, 
Basel-Stadt, referendum
Geneva, referendums
Nidwalden, referendum
Schwyz, 
Zug, 
Tanzania,  and Street/Village Chairs
26 November: India, Rajasthan, Municipal Chairs
26–29 November: Papua New Guinea, Local-Level Governments (revotes)
27 November: 
India, Rajasthan, Municipal Deputy Chairs
Madagascar, 
Saint Helena, Ascension and Tristan da Cunha, Saint Helena, Legislative Council by-election
28 November: Tonga, Tongatapu 1, Legislative Assembly by-election
30 November: 
India, Jharkhand, Legislative Assembly (1st phase)
Ireland, Cork North-Central, Dublin Fingal, Dublin Mid-West and Wexford, Assembly 
Nepal, Kaski 2, House of Representatives by-election
Nigeria, Niger, Local Government Councils and Chairmen

December
2 December: Trinidad and Tobago, Trinidad, Regional Councils and Municipal Councils
5 December: India, Karnataka, Legislative Assembly state by-elections (15 seats)
7 December: 
India, Jharkhand, Legislative Assembly (2nd phase)
Nigeria
Adamawa, Local Government Councils and Chairmen
Ekiti, Local Government Councils and Chairmen
Philippines, Compostela Valley, Province Renaming referendum
10 December: United States, Albuquerque, City Council (2nd round)
12 December: India, Jharkhand, Legislative Assembly (3rd phase)
14 December: United States, Houston, Mayor (2nd round)
15 December: 
Andorra, Municipal Councils
San Marino, Mayors and Municipal Councils
16 December: India, Jharkhand, Legislative Assembly (4th phase)
17 December: Ghana, District Assemblies and Unit Committees
20 December: India, Jharkhand, Legislative Assembly (5th phase)
21 December: India, Chhattisgarh, Municipal Corporations, Municipal Councils and Town Councils
22 December: 
Thailand, Khon Kaen constituency 7, 
Uzbekistan, Regional Councils, District Councils and City Councils (1st round)
23 December: Azerbaijan, 
27 December: India, Tamil Nadu, District Councils, Township Councils and Village Councils (1st phase)
30 December: India, Tamil Nadu, District Councils, Township Councils and Village Councils (2nd phase)

References

2019 elections
2019
Political timelines of the 2010s by year
local